Barlborough is a village and civil parish in the Bolsover district of Derbyshire, England. According to the 2001 census it had a population of 3,018, increasing to 3,261 at the 2011 Census.

Notable residents
John Osborne, goalkeeper for West Bromwich Albion, who won an FA Cup winner's medal in 1967–68, was born here in 1940.
Francis Rodes built nearby Barlborough Hall in the 1580s.

See also
Listed buildings in Barlborough

References

External links
 
 Local council
 

Villages in Derbyshire
Civil parishes in Derbyshire
Bolsover District